Paw Paw High School may refer to:

 Paw Paw High School (Illinois)
 Paw Paw High School (Michigan)
 Paw Paw High School (West Virginia)